Svängsta is a locality situated in Karlshamn Municipality, Blekinge County, Sweden with 1,682 inhabitants in 2010. It is around 12 km north-west of Karlshamn.

Svängsta has a local football club Svängsta IF in a minor division of Swedish football.

References 

Populated places in Karlshamn Municipality